Chaminda Gamage (born 4 February 1987) is a Sri Lankan cricketer. He made his first-class debut for Chilaw Marians Cricket Club in the 2014–15 Premier Trophy on 13 March 2015.

See also
 List of Chilaw Marians Cricket Club players

References

External links
 

1987 births
Living people
Sri Lankan cricketers
Chilaw Marians Cricket Club cricketers
Cricketers from Colombo